Matthew Michael Acton is an Australian footballer who plays as a goalkeeper for Melbourne Victory. Besides Australia, he has played in Myanmar and the Philippines.

Club career
Acton played for Brisbane Roar. He became the first Australian goalkeeper to join the Myanmar National League when Yangon United signed him in. He was a starting player in all of his 14 caps for Yangon where in five games he managed to keep a clean sheet. He assisted Yangon in their second-place finish. After his stint with Yangon he return Brisbane Roar then joined Olympic F.C.

In December 2015, Kaya F.C. of the United Football League announced that they had signed Acton.

On 25 November 2016, Melbourne Victory signed Acton as an injury replacement for Alastair Bray, after both had trialled with Melbourne Victory pre-season.

After Lawrence Thomas was ruled out with injury, Acton made his debut for Melbourne Victory on 26 November 2016, in a 2–0 victory over the Newcastle Jets.

On 24 September 2020, Melbourne Victory Re-signed Acton for extend three year deal.

Personal life
Acton was born in Australia to an English-Finnish father and English mother.

Career statistics

Notes CS = Clean Sheets

1 - includes A-League final series statistics
2 - AFC Champions League statistics are included in season commencing during group stages (i.e. ACL 2015 and A-League season 2014–15 etc.)

Honours

Club
Brisbane Roar
 A-League Championship: 2013–14
 A-League Premiership: 2013–14
Melbourne Victory
 A-League Championship: 2017–18
 FFA Cup: 2021

References

External links
 FFA profile

1992 births
Australian soccer players
Australian people of English descent
Australian people of Finnish descent
Association football goalkeepers
Brisbane Roar FC players
Yangon United F.C. players
Kaya F.C. players
Melbourne Victory FC players
A-League Men players
National Premier Leagues players
Living people
Australian expatriate sportspeople in Myanmar
Expatriate footballers in Myanmar
Australian expatriate sportspeople in the Philippines
Expatriate footballers in the Philippines
Sportspeople from Townsville
Soccer players from Queensland